South Florida is a region of the U.S. state of Florida.

South Florida can also refer to:

University of South Florida in Tampa, Florida
South Florida Bulls, that university's athletics program
South Florida Community College in Highlands, DeSoto and Hardee Counties, Florida
Miami metropolitan area